The Pakistan cricket team toured England in August and September 2020 to play three Tests and three Twenty20 International (T20I) matches. The Test series formed part of the inaugural 2019–2021 ICC World Test Championship. The first Test and the T20I matches were played at Old Trafford, and the second and third Test matches were played at the Rose Bowl. All of the fixtures were played behind closed doors due to the COVID-19 pandemic.

On 5 August 2020, the International Cricket Council (ICC) announced the use of technology to monitor front-foot no-balls for the first time in Test cricket. The third umpire called the front-foot no-balls and communicated this with the on-field umpires. This followed a successful trial in the One Day International (ODI) matches between England and Ireland in the World Cup Super League, which concluded the day before the Test series.

On the final day of the third Test, England's James Anderson became the first fast bowler to take 600 Test wickets. England won the three-match Test series 1–0, after the second and third Tests were drawn. The T20I series was drawn 1–1, with the first match being washed out.

Background
Ahead of the tour to England, Pakistan were scheduled to play three One Day International (ODI) matches in the Netherlands, and two T20I matches in Ireland; however, in April 2020, the matches in the Netherlands were postponed after the Dutch government banned all events in the country, both sports and cultural, until 1 September 2020 due to the COVID-19 pandemic. Because of the pandemic, the England and Wales Cricket Board (ECB) investigated the possibility of hosting the Test matches in bio-secure environments; Old Trafford in Manchester and the Rose Bowl in Southampton were mooted as possible venues due to their hotel facilities. In May 2020, Wasim Khan, the chief executive of the Pakistan Cricket Board (PCB), was in talks with the ECB about the possibility of touring England; the PCB said they were "very optimistic" with regard to the plans. The PCB planned to send a combined Test and T20I squad of 25 players to give them the best options in case of any injuries. In the same month, Babar Azam was named as the new captain of Pakistan's One Day International (ODI) team. Babar said that he had complete faith and trust in the PCB's decision on touring, and said if it were safe to go, he would definitely join the tour.

In late May 2020, a revised schedule was issued, starting with the first Test match at Old Trafford from 5 August 2020. The choice of Old Trafford for the first Test meant it was the first time since England toured South Africa in 1905–06 that the team had played three Tests in a row at the same ground. On 9 June 2020, the PCB appointed Younis Khan and Mushtaq Ahmed respectively as their batting and spin bowling coaches for the tour. The PCB also decided not to hold a training camp for the national team in Lahore, and the board worked with the ECB to bring their travel date forward by a week. On 11 June 2020, the PCB confirmed that Mohammad Amir and Haris Sohail were not available to tour England due to personal reasons. On 12 June 2020, the PCB named a 29-man squad for the tour; the Test side would be captained by Azhar Ali and the T20I side by Babar Azam. After the squad was named, Wahab Riaz said that he would be willing to play Test cricket again, after taking a break from first-class cricket in September 2019.

The PCB announced that the touring party would go through three rounds of COVID-19 testing prior to leaving Pakistan, and would be tested every five days once in England. On 22 June 2020, the PCB confirmed that Haider Ali, Shadab Khan and Haris Rauf had all tested positive for the virus. None of the three players had shown any previous symptoms, and were all advised to go into a period of self-isolation. England's director of cricket, Ashley Giles, said he was "concerned" by the news, but said that the tour was not in doubt. However, the following day, seven more players tested positive for the virus. Despite the increase in positive tests, Wasim Khan said that the tour was still on, and the team planned to depart for England as scheduled. Anyone who tested positive would be allowed to rejoin the squad after they finished their quarantine period and returned two negative tests. Mohammad Hafeez, one of the seven players to test positive on 23 June 2020, tested negative the following day, after taking a private test to get a second opinion. Six of the ten players who initially tested positive returned a negative when they were tested again. On 27 June 2020, the PCB confirmed that 20 players and 11 members of their support staff would be travelling to England. The flight departed from Allama Iqbal International Airport the following morning, and arrived in Manchester later the same day. On 30 June 2020, the six players that tested negative after initially testing positive, provided a second negative test, and travelled to England as soon as possible. They were joined by three more players who provided two negative tests in four days. In July 2020, Wasim Khan admitted that the PCB came under pressure over whether to tour England after so many players returned a positive test.

In June 2020, the International Cricket Council (ICC) made several interim changes to the Playing Conditions due to the pandemic. A substitute could be used for any player showing symptoms of COVID-19, but only in a Test match. Players were banned from using saliva to shine the ball and five penalty runs would be awarded to the opposition for repeated infringements. The requirement to use neutral match officials was temporarily lifted, and the number of DRS reviews for each team in each innings was increased, as the available umpires were less experienced at international level. Following criticism of play being lost in the second Test due to bad light, the ECB agreed that play in the third Test could start half an hour early, at 10:30am, if time was lost during the match due to the weather.

The second T20I match was shown free-to-air on BBC One in the United Kingdom, the first time since 1999 that a live cricket match was broadcast on the BBC. Graham Thorpe, England's interim head coach, said that it provides a "great opportunity for cricket".

Squads

On 12 June 2020, the PCB named a touring squad of 29 players for both the Test and T20I matches. The PCB also named Bilal Asif, Imran Butt, Muhammad Musa and Mohammad Nawaz as reserve players for the tour. On 27 July 2020, the PCB shortlisted a 20-man squad for the Test series. On 4 August 2020, this was trimmed down to a 16-man squad ahead of the first Test.

On 27 June 2020, due to the high number of positive tests for COVID-19, Rohail Nazir was also added to Pakistan's touring party. Zafar Gohar, who is based in England, joined the team when they arrived in the country, but only took part in pre-match preparations. Kashif Bhatti returned a positive COVID-19 test while in England, but was able to rejoin the squad on 16 July 2020 after two negative tests and a period of self-isolation. On 20 July 2020, Mohammad Amir was added to Pakistan's squad for the T20I matches, following the early birth of his second child; Amir had initially ruled himself out of travelling to England. Amir replaced Haris Rauf, after Rauf provided five positive tests out of six for COVID-19 in the last month. On 30 July 2020, the PCB confirmed that Rauf had returned two consecutive negative tests, and was therefore eligible to fly to England to join the Pakistan squad. On 12 August, Mohammad Hafeez had to self-isolate after breaking biosecurity protocols by posing for a photo with a member of the public at the golf course adjoining the Rose Bowl. Hafeez underwent a COVID-19 test the same afternoon, and returned to the squad the following day, after the test was negative.

On 29 July 2020, England named their squad for the first Test, which was unchanged from the side that had beaten the West Indies the previous day. James Bracey, Ben Foakes, Dan Lawrence and Jack Leach were also named as reserve players for the opening fixture. On 9 August 2020, Ben Stokes withdrew from the squad for the final two Test matches to travel to New Zealand due to family reasons; Ollie Robinson was called up in his place. The following day, Lawrence left the England squad to attend a family bereavement, but no replacement for Lawrence was named. On 12 August 2020, Robinson was named in England's squad for the second Test.

On 18 August 2020, the ECB named their 14-man squad for the T20Is, also naming Pat Brown, Liam Livingstone and Reece Topley as reserve players. Ahead of the T20I matches, Jason Roy was ruled out of the series, after suffering a side strain.

Practice matches
Pakistan were due to play two tour matches, a first-class match against a Select XI side, and a 20-over match against Leicestershire. However, the tour matches were cancelled due to the COVID-19 pandemic. Instead, Pakistan played intra-squad matches to serve as preparation. A two-day practice match took place in Worcester, ahead of two four-day matches in Derby. On the morning of the second four-day match, the PCB announced that the match would have first-class status.

Test series

1st Test

After winning the toss and electing to bat, Pakistan openers Shan Masood and Abid Ali put on 36 runs for the first wicket, before Abid was bowled by Jofra Archer with the first ball of the 16th over. Captain Azhar Ali fell next to Chris Woakes, trapped lbw for a duck after facing just six balls. The next man in, Babar Azam, reached his fifty in 70 balls, ahead of Masood, and just before a rain delay and an early tea interval. Just eight more overs were bowled before the day's play was called to an early close with Pakistan on 139/2, Babar having reached 69 and Masood still four runs short of his half-century.

James Anderson opened the bowling to start the second day, as he had on day 1, and it took him just six balls to remove Babar, caught at first slip by England captain Joe Root for a wicket maiden. Masood then reached his fifty in the following over from Stuart Broad, off a more patient 156 balls. Asad Shafiq fell for seven runs seven overs later, edging a ball from Broad to second slip, followed by Mohammad Rizwan, who was caught behind by Jos Buttler for nine runs for Woakes' second wicket of the innings shortly before the lunch interval. After lunch, Masood and Shadab Khan combined for another fifty-partnership, before Masood reached his third century in his last three Test innings (and the fourth of his career) off 251 balls. The pair batted on to reach the first century partnership of the match, but just two overs later, the spin bowling of Dom Bess tempted Shadab into a slog that came off his top edge and was caught by Root at mid-on. Masood reached 150 runs in the final over before tea, but not before Archer took two more wickets in consecutive balls; first, Yasir Shah was trapped lbw and then Mohammad Abbas was caught at first slip. Masood lasted only until the second over of the session, trapped lbw by Broad with his first ball of the evening, which left just Shaheen Afridi and Naseem Shah. They managed just nine more runs before Shah edged a ball from Broad to Buttler behind the stumps to end the innings at 326. England's first innings began poorly with the loss of three wickets for just 12 runs; after review, Rory Burns was trapped lbw by Afridi, while Abbas had Dom Sibley lbw and then bowled Ben Stokes. Root and Ollie Pope then added 50 to the total for the fourth wicket, only for Root to edge a ball from Yasir Shah to wicket-keeper Rizwan, before Buttler and Pope combined to push England towards 100 runs at the close of play; at the end of the day, Pope was on 46 and England were on 92/4.

Pope reached his fifty early on the third day, but the scoring rate was slow, and shortly after he and Buttler had reached their fifty-partnership, Pope was caught in the gully for 62 off the bowling of Naseem Shah. Buttler and Woakes then batted through to the lunch break, but the second over after the interval saw Yasir Shah beat Buttler's bat with a delivery that went on to hit off stump, and the England batsman was out for 38. Shah also took the next two wickets at regular intervals, as Bess edged him to slip for 1 before Woakes suffered the same fate as Buttler, out bowled. It was then left to Shadab Khan to finish off the England tail, finding the edge of Archer's bat for a catch by Rizwan before trapping Anderson lbw. With Broad not out on 29, England closed their innings on 219 runs, trailing by 107. Pakistan sought to add to their lead with two days and a little over a session left to play, but the hero of their first innings, Shan Masood, was unable to repeat his exploits, out for a duck after a thin edge behind off Broad in the second over. Abid Ali and Azhar Ali got Pakistan through the tea interval, but little further as Abid Ali was tempted into a big shot by Bess, only to see the ball come off the top edge of his bat and caught in the deep by Woakes for 20. Woakes himself then removed Babar Azam for 5, caught in the slips by Stokes, and Azhar Ali, trapped lbw for 18. Asad Shafiq and Mohammad Rizwan put on 38 for the fifth wicket, but a direct hit of the stumps by Sibley saw Shafiq run out for 29 while attempting a quick single. Stokes struck a few overs later, after a Pakistan review confirmed that his delivery to Rizwan would have gone on to hit the stumps; England then used a review in the next over to consign Shadab Khan to the same fate after umpire Richard Illingworth had initially ruled Broad's delivery not out. In the final over of the day, Stokes struck again as a short ball came off the splice of Shaheen Afridi's bat and looped to Rory Burns in the gully. Pakistan finished the day on 137/8, with a lead of 244.

In an attempt to set a defendable target for England's batsmen to chase, Pakistan came out with aggressive intent; Yasir Shah hit three fours and a six before edging a ball from Broad behind to Buttler. Naseem Shah showed the same spirit, hitting a four off his first ball, but he was bowled by Archer in the very next over to bring Pakistan's innings to a close on a score of 169. England thus came out with a target of 277 to win the match, and almost two days to get them in. Burns started the brighter of the two openers, scoring 10 runs off the first five overs, but his scoring was throttled back and with the first ball of the 11th over, he was trapped lbw by Abbas without having added to his score. Sibley had passed him, meanwhile, and he and Root worked to add 64 runs to the total before he was tempted into a big shot by Yasir Shah that was edged to the slips with the pair on 36 each. Root was next to go three overs later, as Naseem Shah found his edge to dismiss the England captain for 42. The wicket of Stokes (9) another three overs later, also caught behind off Shah, continued England's mini-collapse, and the loss of Pope for 7 left them at 117/5, still 160 runs from victory. Buttler and Woakes managed to pick up 50 of the required runs before tea, and the pair each reached half-centuries in the 10th over of the final session of the day, followed by the century partnership a few overs later. Buttler ultimately reached 75 before he was trapped lbw by Yasir Shah while attempting a reverse sweep, ending the partnership at 139 runs. Having scored 29 off 25 balls in the first innings, England sent out Broad to join Woakes in the hunt for the remaining 21 runs; he ultimately contributed seven runs to a partnership of 17 as Woakes continued to hold up his end, Broad out lbw to Shah. Bess survived the remainder of that over, leaving Woakes on strike to face Shaheen Afridi with four runs needed; off the first ball of the over, Woakes edged the ball through the slip cordon to the boundary for the required runs. For his unbeaten innings of 84 runs, Woakes was named player of the match.

2nd Test

3rd Test

T20I series

1st T20I

2nd T20I

3rd T20I

Notes

References

External links
 Series home at ESPN Cricinfo

2020 in Pakistani cricket
2020 in English cricket
International cricket competitions in 2020
Pakistani cricket tours of England
August 2020 sports events in the United Kingdom